Jean Dréville (20 September 1906 – 5 March 1997) was a French film director. He directed more than 40 films between 1928 and 1969.

Selected filmography

 Autour de L'Argent (1928)
 A Man of Gold (1934)
 The Chess Player (1938)
 His Uncle from Normandy (1939)
 President Haudecoeur (1940)
 Annette and the Blonde Woman (1942)
 A Cage of Nightingales (1945)
 Return to Life (1949)
 The Girl with the Whip (1952)
 The Secret of the Mountain Lake (1952)
 Endless Horizons (1953)
 Queen Margot (1954)
 Stopover in Orly (1955)
 A Dog, a Mouse, and a Sputnik (1958)
 Nights of Farewell (1965)
 The Last of the Mohicans (1968)

References

External links

1906 births
1997 deaths
French film directors